The Bridge is the second album by Swedish pop music group Ace of Base. It was composed during 1994 and 1995, and released in Europe on 30 October 1995. It is the only Ace of Base album to feature sizable contributions of writing, production, vocals, and harmonies by all four band members, each having an important part in its creation.

The album was preceded by the singles "Beautiful Life" and "Lucky Love", which had varied levels of success. Both songs reached the top of the US Billboard Hot Dance Club Play chart and "Beautiful Life" peaked at number 15 on the US Billboard Hot 100, "Lucky Love" reaching number 30. Following the release of the album, "Never Gonna Say I'm Sorry" was released as the third and final single from the album but failed to gain recognition due to a lack of promotion.

Background and composition

On January 1, 1994, The Sign album and single hit number 1 on the Billboard Hot 100. Inspired by the band's success, Jonas penned the first song of what would become The Bridge while returning from vacation in the Canary Islands. The song was "Beautiful Life". Jonas hoped to incorporate gospel elements into the song, which was composed retaining the band's original club-friendly beat.

Because the band was still promoting their previous album, work on The Bridge was infrequent during much of 1994. In April 1994, an obsessed German fan broke into the Berggren family home and threatened both Jenny and her parents at knifepoint. Jenny would later use this experience as a source of inspiration in writing and composing the track "Ravine" for The Bridge.

For the album, Jonas and Ulf each separately composed a half-dozen songs. Instead of working together, as they had done on their previous album, Jonas and Ulf produced separately with different producers. Jonas' songs were recorded mainly at Cheiron Studios in Stockholm, while Ulf's tracks were created at Tuff Studios in Gothenburg. Ulf continued to work with John Ballard and StoneStream (Björn Stenstrom). In Stockholm, Jonas worked with producer Max Martin and vocalist Jeanette Söderholm. He also worked with Denniz Pop who had previously collaborated with the band on the hits "All That She Wants" and The Sign".

For the first time, Jenny and Linn also composed and produced songs. Their tracks were recorded mainly at Tuff Studios. Jenny mainly wrote and composed her pieces and relinquished production duties. Linn, on the other hand, took an active role in both writing and production and received production credits on the album. Linn worked with producers Zal and Radiant as well as previous collaborators Tommy Ekman and Per Adebratt. Although Linn would continue to receive writing credits on the band's later release, Da Capo, The Bridge is the only Ace of Base album which features production from her. "Lapponia", a track produced by Linn which was submitted and rejected for inclusion on The Bridge, would later be re-submitted for the band's following album, where it was yet again rejected.

By the turn of the year, the band had recorded enough demos to present to their three major record companies. Ulf and Jenny appeared on VH1's Lift Ticket to Ride and mentioned the band's new recordings.

Despite having writing and production credits on three tracks on The Bridge, Linn expressed dissatisfaction with the album. Douglass Carr of StoneStream believed the album should have been more successful, stating "The album had some really potential hits on it [and] the singles should have been bigger than it was". Claes Cornelius of Mega Records thought the album was "a better record" and "more varied" than their first album but also noted that The Bridge had less commercial appeal.

Singles
"Lucky Love" was released as the first single from the album in Europe on 2 October 1995. The song was a success, reaching the top twenty in thirteen countries and the number one spot in Sweden and Finland. The accompanying music video was directed by Rocky Schenck.

"Beautiful Life" was released as the album's first single in North America on 24 October 1995. It was released as the second single from the album in Europe on 20 November. The colorful music video for the song was directed by Richard Heslop. The video included computer-generated bubbles which whisked the band from place to place. Arista Records insisted that the bubbles be removed for the North American release. Both versions of the video were released in Europe. To support the release, the band appeared in Canada and Mexico and performed in several Latin America countries. "Beautiful Life" was a success in the United States, peaking at number 15 on the Billboard Hot 100 and becoming their second single in a row to reach the number one spot on the US Billboard Hot Dance Club Play chart. The song went on to peak at number 3 in Canada and at number 15 in the United Kingdom.

An acoustic version of "Lucky Love" was released as the album's second single in North America on 6 February 1996. This version was accompanied by a new music video shot in January in the Hampton Court House. This release was not as successful as their previous efforts and only reached number 30 on the Billboard Hot 100, becoming their first release to miss the top twenty. It did, however, manage to become the band's third and final number one hit in a row on the US Billboard Hot Dance Club Play chart. In Canada, the song peaked at number 6.

"Never Gonna Say I'm Sorry" was released worldwide as the third and final single from the album. It was released in Europe on 11 March 1996 and in the United States on 30 July. The music video for the song was directed by Richard Heslop, who had previously directed the band's video for "Beautiful Life". Similar in composition to "Beautiful Life", the video includes computer-generated imagery and mirror effects designed to make the video feel like a funhouse. Arista Records was dissatisfied with the piece and decided not to release a video to accompany the single release in North America. The song received little promotion and failed to chart on the Billboard Hot 100.

Though no further singles from the album were released, promotional releases of "My Déjà Vu" appeared in France and Scandinavia in late 1996. In 1998, Polydor released a limited-release single-track promotional disc of "Angel Eyes". This was the very last Bridge release, and was packaged with the Southeast Asia version of Flowers.

Promotion
Ace of Base appeared at several concerts around the world during 1996, including their second-largest performance ever at Viña del Mar, Chile, where the band performed in front of 20,000 fans. They also appeared in South-East Asia, where by some fan accounts, they performed poorly. At one point, lead singer Linn flew home. The band appeared the following year in April at the World Music Awards, where they accepted the award for Best Selling Scandinavian Artists of 1996. There, Jenny performed a solo, lip-synced rendition of "Ravine".

Critical reception

Upon its release, The Bridge received generally mixed reviews from music critics. Many critics noted the departure in sound from their first album, with Q calling it "altogether bigger, deeper, darker, more accomplished effort than its rather half-baked predecessor" and Spin noting that the songs on The Bridge were "far more sophisticated than their pop pedigree would suggest." Music & Media stated that "there's no denying Ace Of Base knows how to write unassuming, catchy pop for the masses. Jim Farber of Entertainment Weekly believed the album had "more textured production" than The Sign.

In contrast, Stephen Thomas Erlewine of AllMusic wrote that the album "sounds like the same record on the surface", but also noted that the album featured "an improved sense of songwriting" and "tightly constructed pop songs that are better written than they appear". Despite giving The Sign a higher rating in his review of the album, he noted that The Bridge had songs that were "overall better than the ones on The Sign." Jean Rosenbluth of the Los Angeles Times was more critical in her review, noting that the "inscrutable liner notes are more entertaining" than the album itself.

Commercial performance
The Bridge is certified platinum in the United States, where the album peaked at 29 and spent 29 weeks on the chart. 5 million copies of the album were sold worldwide.

Track listing

Release history

Charts

Weekly charts

Year-end charts

Certifications and sales

Notes

References 
 
 www.riaa.com

1995 albums
Ace of Base albums
Albums produced by Max Martin
Albums recorded at Cheiron Studios
Edel-Mega Records albums
Arista Records albums

hu:The Bridge